Oulun Kärpät Naiset ('Oulu's Ermine Women') are an ice hockey team in the Naisten Liiga. They play in Oulu, a city on the northeastern coast of the Bothnian Bay in the Finnish north-central region of North Ostrobothnia, at the  ('Raksila training ice rink'), also called Raksila 2, of the Oulun Energia Areena. Ilves have won the Aurora Borealis Cup three times, in 2012, 2017, and 2018.

The team’s parent club, Oulun Kärpät 46 ry, is the junior affiliate of the Liiga team Oulun Kärpät and, through that association, the teams are loosely affiliated.

Season-by-season results 
This is a partial list of the most recent seasons completed by Oulun Kärpät Naiset. Note: Finish = Rank at end of regular season; GP = Games played, W = Wins (3 points), OTW = Overtime wins (2 points), OTL = Overtime losses (1 point), L = Losses, GF = Goals for, GA = Goals against, Pts = Points, Top scorer: Points (Goals+Assists)

Players and personnel

2022–23 roster 

Coaching staff and team personnel
 Head coach: Sanna Lankosaari
 Assistant coach: Aku-Petteri Antti-Roiko
 Assistant coach: Satu Kiipeli
 Goaltending coach: Minna Mursu
 Conditioning coach: Raimo Huhtanen
 Mental coach: Marjo Mäyrä
 Team managers: Mika Kaijankoski & Ismo Rantasuomela
 Equipment managers: Veli-Matti Puusaari, Jari Siermala & Jukka Välitalo

Team captains 
 Katja Riipi, 1997–98
 Päivi Salo, 2001–02
 Eini Lehtinen, 2004–2008
 Mira Jalosuo, 2008–09
 Saija Tarkki, 2009–10
 Anne Helin, 2010–2013
 Niina Mäkinen, 2013–14
 Isa Rahunen, 2014–2019
 Saila Saari, 2019–20
 Suvi Käyhkö, 2020–2022
 Aino Kaijankoski, 2022–

Head coaches 
 Kari Ikonen & Pasi Sorvisto, 1994–1997
 Kari Ikonen, Katri Niemelä & Pasi Sorvisto, 1997–98
 Kari Ikonen & Pasi Sorvisto, 1998–99
 Risto Liikka, 1999–2003
 Lauri Merikivi, 2007–2010
 Seppo Karjalainen, 2012–13
 Mira Kuisma, 2015–2019
 Janne Salmela, 2019–2021
 Samuli Hassi, 2021–22
 Sanna Lankosaari, 2022–

Team honors

Finnish Champions 
The winner of the Naisten Liiga playoffs receives the Aurora Borealis Cup and earns the Finnish Champion title, with gold medals awarded to each player. Prior to the 2010–11 season, the victorious team was awarded Finnish Championship title and medals only.
  Aurora Borealis Cup (3): 2012, 2017, 2018
  Runners-up (7): 1996, 1998, 2000, 2001, 2003, 2006, 2007
  Third Place (7): 2002, 2004, 2005, 2008, 2011, 2013, 2019, 2022

IIHF European Women's Champions Cup
  Bronze (1): 2013

Notable alumni 
Years active with Kärpät listed alongside players' names.
 Sanni Hakala, 2016–17
 Anne Helin, 2008–2013
 Mira Jalosuo, 2004–2009 & 2016–2018
 Aino Karppinen, 2019–20
 Satu Kiipeli, 1991–2000 & 2008–2015
 Sanna Lankosaari, 1994–2001
 Eini Lehtinen, 1995–2008
 Mira Jalosuo, 2004–2009 & 2016–2018
 Marjo Mäyrä, 1994–2002
 Jenni Pitkänen, 2001–2010
 Marja-Helena Pälvilä, 1995–2001, 2002–2006 & 2012–13
 Katja Riipi, 1994–1999
 Saila Saari, 2016–2020
 Päivi Salo, 1994–2002
 Satu Salonpää, 1990–2003
 Henna Savikuja, 1995–2005 & 2006–2012
 Saija Tarkki, 1997–2010 & 2011–2019
 Niina Tikkinen, 2005–2007 & 2011–2015

International players 

 Michaela Matejová, 2008–09
 Marianne Mattila, 1994–95
 Josefine Quaade, 2000–01

See also 
 Women's ice hockey in Finland

References

External links 
 Team information and statistics from Eliteprospects.com and Eurohockey.com and Hockeyarchives.info 
 
 
 

Naisten Liiga (ice hockey) teams
Sport in Oulu
1990 establishments in Finland